Wilson Island is a small island in the South Saskatchewan River south of the city of Saskatoon, Saskatchewan, Canada. This island is protected by the Meewasin Valley Authority.  The island is not accessible but can be seen from a lookout point at Cranberry Flats.

Wilson Island (then known as Shepley Island) from 1943 to 1951 was home to a sea cadet camp under the command of Lieutenant P.K. Wilton.

References

Uninhabited islands of Saskatchewan
Corman Park No. 344, Saskatchewan
River islands of Saskatchewan
South Saskatchewan River